Egor Sergeyevich Lavrov (born June 4, 1981, Moscow, Soviet Union) is a crypto currency scammer who made his money in Internet-related projects, political PR, and a number of businesses in the United States and Latin America. Currently Lavrov lives in the Dominican Republic.

Early years
Lavrov was born in Moscow, Russia. He studied at private school called Kommersant, spent a year in London and later moved to Prague, Czech Republic.

He finished school in Prague and came back to Moscow during a period of rising interest in the Internet in Russia. He later joined Plekhanov Institute of the National Economy and started his own business at the same time.

Early political and business career
Larov's first business was the first Internet-related magazine in Russia called Planeta Internet. It was later sold to Smolensky Bank who paid about 2 million dollars to Lavrov when he was just 16 years old.

Lavrov's next step in business was the GFX Advertisement Company that later was acquired by the "Plaza Group" and transformed to "PLAZA Internet" that was a base for Internet projects of Egor Lavrov and Umar Dzhabrailov such as "obozrenie.ru" and "fuck.ru".

When Lavrov was 19 he became a head of the election campaign of Umar Dzhabrailov who ran for the President of Russia.

Dzhabrailov came in last with 0.8 percent of the vote but became Chechnya's representative in the Federation Council of Russia.

At the following presidential and legislative elections in Russia, Lavrov worked on several Internet projects with Konstantin Rykov to support the Vladimir Putin candidacy.

Business

Lavrov owns "Grupo Lavrov", a company that owns:

"Friends Around": Geo-Aware Mobile Social Network 
Zila Networks
Karma World 
"Pravda Group"
"Russian Standard Group" - a company that distributes Apple, Inc. in Latin American market.
"LUX.SET" - construction company in the Dominican Republic.
"LUX.CELL" - a company that distributes Vertu brand in the Latin American market.
"ELFA" - financial advising company for the private investors in the Dominican Republic.
"ELPA" - PR advising, political campaigns, Internet advertisement. So far a President of the Dominican Republic Leonel Fernández enjoyed the support of the "ELPA" during the last presidential campaign in the country, as well as a current Member of Parliament Gerardo Bogaert.
Tattoolizator.com - A project inviting people to design and select a tattoo to be placed on Egor Lavrov's hand.
ParagonCoin – US-based startup scam that teamed-up with ICOBox and got the funds using ICO mechanism. In 2018, SEC initiated a Federal class-action lawsuit against Paragon Coin.

References

External links
Twitter
Official Site
Russian language blog
Article
Magazine
Information
Showbiz article

1981 births
Living people
Businesspeople from Moscow
Plekhanov Russian University of Economics alumni